Miss India Worldwide is a beauty pageant which draws contestants from India and from among members of the Indian diaspora residing in other countries. It is conducted by India Festival Committee (IFC), first founded and headed by Dharmatma Saran in New York City, USA.

History

The pageant started in 1990. Simi Chaddha (now Dr. Simi Chaddha Ranajee) from the United States was crowned the first ever Miss India Worldwide in New York City. Simi was the winner of Miss India USA pageant of the year 1990. The pageant was held in the United States till 1996. In 1997, the pageant was hosted in India. Poonam Chibber of Canada became the first Miss India Worldwide winner to get crowned outside the United States. It was the first time that the pageant moved out its home turf and held in the Asian continent. The very next year in 1998 the pageant moved to the South east region of Asia and was held in Singapore. Once again, Canada's representative Melissa Bhagat was crowned the Miss India Worldwide 1998 by outgoing titleholder Poonam Chibber of Canada as well, giving Canada a rare back to back victory at the pageant. Canada is one of the three countries to have a back to back victory. Other two being USA and UK.

The pageant moved back to the United States in 2000 and was held in Florida. Rita Upadhyay of the United States was crowned Miss India Worldwide 2000 and became the fourth woman from the United States to win the crown.

Notable Miss India Worldwide Participants
Past pageant participants include Bollywood actress Pallavi Sharda (Miss India Australia 2010), media personality and television host Amin Dhillon (Miss India Worldwide Canada 2010), Indian television actress Uppekha Jain (Miss India Worldwide Canada 2008)

Titleholders

References

Beauty pageants for people of specific ethnic or national descents
Culture of Indian diaspora
Recurring events established in 1990
International beauty pageants
Continental beauty pageants
1990 establishments in the United States